Jarbas Tomazoli Nunes (born 17 September 1957), known as just Jarbas, is a Brazilian former footballer who played as a forward. He competed in the men's tournament at the 1976 Summer Olympics.

References

External links
 

Living people
1957 births
Footballers from São Paulo
Brazilian footballers
Association football forwards
Brazil international footballers
Olympic footballers of Brazil
Footballers at the 1976 Summer Olympics
America Football Club (Rio de Janeiro) players